The Australia women's national cricket team toured New Zealand in February 2009. They played against New Zealand in five One Day Internationals, which were competed for the Rose Bowl. The series was drawn 2–2 after the final match was abandoned due to rain.

Squads

WODI Series

1st ODI

2nd ODI

3rd ODI

4th ODI

5th ODI

References

External links
Australia Women tour of New Zealand 2008/09 from Cricinfo

Women's international cricket tours of New Zealand
2009 in New Zealand cricket
Australia women's national cricket team tours